Riaz Nabi Mohammed (born 5 May 1972 in Madras, Tamil Nadu) is a former captain of the Indian field hockey team. He represented India at the 1996 and 2000 Summer Olympics. He won the Arjuna award in 1998 for his outstanding achievements. He has won the title for "Best Sportsmen of the year" from Tamil Nadu's chief minister in 1999. His father was an international umpire. He was the Coach for Indian Hockey team at London Olympics.
He currently serves as the Chairman selection committee for Tamil Nadu Hockey Association.

References

External links
 

1972 births
Field hockey players from Chennai
Olympic field hockey players of India
Field hockey players at the 1996 Summer Olympics
Field hockey players at the 2000 Summer Olympics
Recipients of the Arjuna Award
Living people
Indian male field hockey players
Asian Games medalists in field hockey
Field hockey players at the 1994 Asian Games
Field hockey players at the 1998 Asian Games
Asian Games gold medalists for India
Asian Games silver medalists for India
Medalists at the 1994 Asian Games
Medalists at the 1998 Asian Games
1998 Men's Hockey World Cup players